Conservatives.nl was a minor political party in the Netherlands that was founded by Winny de Jong and Cor Eberhard as a splinter party from the Lijst Pim Fortuyn (LPF). Both had been elected as MPs to the House of Representatives of the Netherlands in 2002.

It was led by de Jong from 2002 to 2003.

History
DeConservatieven.nl was the result of a split from the Pim Fortuyn List. Winny de Jong and Cor Eberhard had been elected to parliament as MPs for the party in the 2002 Dutch general election. De Jong had been named by the party's leader Pim Fortuyn as his candidate to be the parliamentary faction leader of the LPF after the election. However, the LPF succumbed to infighting after Fortuyn was assassinated in the run-up to the election. De Jong left the party due to the internal disputes and founded a one-woman faction Group de Jong. She was joined by Eberhard and they subsequently founded the party together.

The party attempted to run in the 2003 Dutch general election. It encountered some controversy when it was discovered the second candidate on the list Michiel Smit had been associated with internet white power groups including the site Stormfront. The party won around 0.3% of the vote in the 2003 election and did not return any MPs to parliament. It de-registered itself shortly after.

References

Defunct nationalist parties in the Netherlands
Political parties established in 2002
Political parties disestablished in 2003
Right-wing populism in the Netherlands
Secularism in the Netherlands
2002 establishments in the Netherlands
2003 disestablishments in the Netherlands
Conservative parties in the Netherlands